Willie Southorn is a New Zealand rugby league player who represented New Zealand.

Playing career
Southorn played for Taranaki and the New Zealand Māori side.

In 1966 and 1967 Southorn played two test matches for the New Zealand national rugby league team.

Legacy
In 2008 he was named in the Taranaki Rugby League Team of the Century.

References

New Zealand rugby league players
New Zealand national rugby league team players
Taranaki rugby league team players
Rugby league wingers
New Zealand Māori rugby league players
New Zealand Māori rugby league team players
Living people
Year of birth missing (living people)